Ochilo George Mbogo Ayacko (born 1968) is a Kenyan politician who has served as the Governor of Migori County since August 2022.

He previously represented Migori County in the Senate of Kenya, beginning with the October 2018 by-election to replace Senator Ben Oluoch, who died in June 2018.

History

Ayacko's political career began in 1997, when he was elected to the Parliament of Kenya, representing Rongo. He was re elected in 2002 and appointed to head the Ministry of Energy and later the ministry of Gender and Sports, where he helped create the first commissions and councils on gender, disability and youths, and pushed through the rural electrification programme under the late President Mwai Kibaki,

After being defeated in the 2007 Kenyan general election, Ayacko served as executive chairman and CEO of the Kenya Nuclear Electricity Board, and in 2015 was elected chair of the African Commission on Nuclear Energy.

In 2013 when members of the public approached him to vie as governor on the onset of devolution, he declined after ODM offered the mandate to Prof Edward Akong’o, who was defeated by outgoing Governor Okoth Obado on a PDP ticket.
</ref>
In 2017, Ayacko ran for Governor of Migori County, but lost to Okoth Obado Ayacko made a legal challenge against Obado's victory, but this was dismissed by the Court of Appeal of Kenya.
 
In 2018, Ayacko was listed as a nominee for an ambassadorial position; however, he declined this, on the basis that he wished to continue pursuing electoral politics. In October 2018 he was elected as the third senator for Migori county after a by election beating his closest challenger Eddy Oketch Gicheru. 

In 2020, he became the vice chair of the senate committee on finance and budget.  Ayacko was nominated by the Orange Democratic Movement as their preferred candidate for the Migori gubernatorial race,  and subsequently won the election, defeating John Dache Pesa by 175,226 votes to 126,171.

Education
He is a holder of a Bachelor of Laws degree (LL.B) and masters (LL.M) both from the University of Nairobi and also a Doctorate in Leadership & Change Management from the United States International University

References

External links
Official site at the Parliament of Kenya

Living people
University of Nairobi alumni
Marquette University alumni
University of Montpellier alumni
Orange Democratic Movement politicians
Government ministers of Kenya
Energy ministers
Members of the Senate of Kenya
1968 births
County Governors of Kenya